Irdabama (fl. early 5th-century BC), was an Ancient Persian businesswoman during the reign of Darius I (r. 522-485 BC). She is the most well known and wealthiest businesswoman attested to in the records of the Achaemenid Empire at Persepolis.

It is not clear exactly who Irdabama was, but she was clearly very rich.  She has been suggested to be of aristocratic or royal birth.  It is also possible that she was in fact two different women.  

She possessed her own work forces, include 480 laborers, mainly centered in what is today Shiraz.  She is the most notable example of Persian women of this era who owned land and estates in Iran as well as outside Iran such as Babylonia, Syria, Egypt, and Media.   She mainly dealt in wine and grain and oversaw business holdings, production centers and her estates.

Several seals have been found regarding her business transactions.  It is described how she distributed her goods and food rations to her staff and how she supervised the management of her vast land holdings.  She travelled widely around Iran and Mesopotamia with her own entourage of servants.

References

 Stephanie Lynn Budin, Jean Macintosh Turfa:    Women in Antiquity: Real Women across the Ancient World
  From Cyrus to Alexander: A History of the Persian Empire
  King and Court in Ancient Persia 559 to 331 BCE

6th-century BC Iranian people
5th-century BC Iranian people
Ancient businesswomen
5th-century businesspeople
5th-century BC women
Women of the Achaemenid Empire
Ancient landowners
6th-century BC women